Joseph A. Konstan is an American computer scientist, the Distinguished McKnight University Professor and Distinguished University Teaching Professor at the University of Minnesota. His research interests are human computer interaction, social computing, collaborative information filtering, online communities and medical and health applications of Internet technology. He is best known for his work in collaborative filtering recommenders (the GroupLens project), and for his work in online HIV prevention.

He received the SIGCHI Lifetime Service Award in 2013.

References

University of California, Berkeley alumni
Harvard University alumni
University of Minnesota faculty
American computer scientists
Human–computer interaction researchers
Fellows of the Association for Computing Machinery
Fellow Members of the IEEE
Living people
Year of birth missing (living people)